The 2022 Martyr's Memorial B-Division League season was the 2022 edition of the Martyr's Memorial B-Division League. It started on 2 March 2022.

Teams 
A total of 14 teams will contest the league with a relegation system. Ten teams from 2020 season, one team relegated from A-Division and three teams promoted from C-Division will participate in the league. Saraswati Youth Club was relegated from 2019–20 season, while Church Boys, Birgunj United Club and Samajik Yuwa Club were promoted from 2021 season.

Personnel and kits

Venues
The league was played centrally in one venue in Lalitpur. For the final matchday, selected matches were played at Dasarath Rangasala.

League table

Results

Positions by round

Broadcast rights 
All matches are streamed live on Eleven Sports.

Controversy
On 23 March 2022, after losing against Bansbari Club, officials of Shree Bhagawati attacked referee Suman Shrestha. The following day, All Nepal Football Association sanctioned Shree Bhagawati Club coach Sailesh Karmacharya by banning him for three games. The club was also been fined with NPR 50,000.

References 

Martyr's Memorial B-Division League seasons